Thomas Sandon (born 11 July 2003) is an Italian professional football player who plays for Vicenza.

Club career 
Having come through the youth ranks of Vicenza, Thomas Sandon made his professional debut for the Venetian team on the 3 October 2021, replacing Daniel Cappelletti in a 4–2 away Serie B win against Pordenone.

International career 
Sandon is a youth international for Italy, having become a regular with the under-19 since August 2021.

References

External links

2003 births
Living people
Italian footballers
Italy youth international footballers
Association football defenders
Sportspeople from the Province of Padua
L.R. Vicenza players
Serie B players
Footballers from Veneto